Polignano a Mare is a railway station in the Italian town of Polignano a Mare, in the Province of Bari, Apulia. The station lies on the Adriatic Railway (Ancona–Lecce). The train services are operated by Trenitalia.

Train services
The station is served by the following service(s):

Regional services (Treno regionale) Bari - Monopoli - Brindisi - Lecce

See also
Railway stations in Italy
List of railway stations in Apulia
Rail transport in Italy
History of rail transport in Italy

External links

This article is based upon a translation of the Italian language version as at May 2014.

Railway stations in Apulia
Railway stations opened in 1865
Buildings and structures in the Province of Bari